Kim Jin-il (born 12 July 1981) is a South Korean sport shooter.

He participated at the 2018 ISSF World Shooting Championships, winning a medal.

References

External links

Living people
1981 births
South Korean male sport shooters
ISSF pistol shooters
Asian Games medalists in shooting
Shooters at the 2014 Asian Games
Asian Games bronze medalists for South Korea
Medalists at the 2014 Asian Games
20th-century South Korean people
21st-century South Korean people